Hog calling, or pig calling, is the art of making a call to encourage pigs to approach the caller. Competitions in hog calling are held.

Calls
To attract pigs (or family), the calls are based on four strategies: a male call to encourage territorial males to come to fight, a female call to encourage males to come to mate, a general call of dinner is served, and a piglet in distress call which works on adults.

Aids to calling
Calls are usually simple woodwind instruments, sometimes adapted from other hunting lures.  Electronic devices are also available.

Contests
Hog calling contests are usually held in regions with pig farming.

Rules may vary between competitions. There usually is a time limit of 30 seconds, but some festivals allow for longer time. In competitions where there is no set rule for the duration of the call, it can be a criterium for judgement, awarding more points for sustained loud calls. The contestants are also judged on creativity. The contestant should aim to mimic a hog's call, but the exact type of call may vary. For example, some might call out "SOOO-o-oeeyyy" and others "Who-o-eyyy". The use of props and costumes might also happen, but is usually frowned upon. Despite being originally about communicating with pigs scattered over a field, modern hog calling competitions will provide a microphone for contestants to amplify their calls. However, it is expected that the champion of a contest is able to render the microphone redundant. While some contests take the audience excitement as a necessary criterion of a good hog call, others consider that to be a side effect of the performance. And finally some contests divide participants by age (having a separate contest for kids and adults), while others mix everyone. 

In the 2015 Illinois State Fair, in Illinois, United States, the winner of the hog calling contest had already participated 24 times and won 10 of them. That competitions involved four contestants.

In popular culture
In the short story, "Pig-hoo-o-o-o-ey", by P.G. Wodehouse the sow Empress of Blandings misses her first keeper, Wellbeloved, when he is sent to jail for a spell; her pining is worrisome to her owner (Lord Emsworth), with the big show approaching, until she is pepped up by James Belford's hog calling techniques, returning to her trough with enough gusto to take her first silver medal.

The Arkansas Razorbacks chant is Calling the Hogs.

See also
 Duck calling

References

External links
 Pig Hunting Tips: How to Call in Wild Hogs

Pig farming
Boar hunting